Kenneth Steele (17 December 1889 – 19 December 1956) was an Australian cricketer. He played in two first-class matches for South Australia in 1913/14.

See also
 List of South Australian representative cricketers

References

External links
 

1889 births
1956 deaths
Australian cricketers
South Australia cricketers
Cricketers from Adelaide